NVC community SD12 (Carex arenaria - Festuca ovina - Agrostis capillaris dune grassland) is one of the 16 sand-dune communities in the British National Vegetation Classification system.

It is one of four communities associated with fixed dunes.

It is a very localised community. There are two subcommunities.

Community composition

The following constant species are found in this community:
 Common Bent (Agrostis capillaris)
 Marram (Ammophila arenaria)
 Sand Sedge (Carex arenaria)
 Sheep's Fescue (Festuca ovina)
 Smooth Meadow-grass (Poa pratensis)

The following rare species is also associated with the community:
 Purple Milk-vetch (Astragalus danicus)

Distribution

This community is found in five coastal localities - one in northeast Scotland, two in southwest Scotland, one in Cumbria and one in Wales.

Subcommunities

There are two subcommunities:
 the Anthoxanthaum odoratum subcommunity
 the Holcus lanatus subcommunity

References

 Rodwell, J. S. (2000) British Plant Communities Volume 5 - Maritime communities and vegetation of open habitats  (hardback),  (paperback)

SD12